South Eleuthera is one of the districts of the Bahamas, on the island of Eleuthera.

The district had a population of 4,955 in 2010. Tarpum Bay and Rock Sound are the largest settlements.

Transportation
The district is served by Rock Sound International Airport.

References

Districts of the Bahamas
Eleuthera